General elections were held in Sint Maarten on 26 September 2016.

Electoral system
The 15 seats in the Estates were elected by proportional representation. In order to participate in the election, new parties and parties without a seat in parliament were required to obtain at least 146 signatures; 1% of the valid votes of the 2014 parliamentary elections.

Results

References

Elections in Sint Maarten
Sint Maarten
2016 in Sint Maarten